Glaiza may refer to:
 Glaiza de Castro, Filipina actress
 Glaiza Herradura, Filipina former child actress

See also 
 Grand Glaiza, a mountain in the Alps

Feminine given names
Filipino feminine given names